Mohammed Ilyas Cherchar (born 18 January 1992) is an Algerian football player who plays for RC Arbaâ in the Algerian Ligue Professionnelle 1.

Club career
A product of the ASO Chlef youth ranks, Cherchar joined the AC FAF Academy in 2007 in preparation for the 2009 African U-17 Championship that Algeria was hosting. 
In January 2010, Cherchar joined French club SAS Épinal before signing for AS Nancy six months later. After spending three seasons with Nancy's reserve team, Cherchar returned to Algeria and signed a two-year contract with his boyhood club ASO Chlef.

International career
Cherchar was a member of the Algeria national under-17 football team that finished as runners-up at the 2009 African U-17 Championship and subsequently played at the 2009 FIFA U-17 World Cup in Nigeria. Cherchar started all three of Algeria's games in the competition, captaining the squad in the opener against Italy.

References

External links
 

1992 births
Algeria youth international footballers
Algerian footballers
Algerian expatriates in France
Algerian Ligue Professionnelle 1 players
AS Nancy Lorraine players
ASO Chlef players
Expatriate footballers in France
Living people
SAS Épinal players
RC Arbaâ players
Association football defenders
21st-century Algerian people